The Yakovlev Pchela-1T ("Пчела" meaning bee) is an unmanned aerial vehicle (UAV) manufactured by the Russian Yakovlev Design Bureau. Its primary use is for surveillance and observation in battlefield environments with downlinked video. Other implementations and uses include target designation and as a training target.

Design

The Pchela is launched using rocket assist by two solid-propellant booster rocket engines, and it is recovered via parachute. Yakovlev lists the vehicle endurance at two hours.

Operators

References

External links

 Yakovlev Design Bureau
 Pchela Diagram

Unmanned aerial vehicles of Russia
Pchela
Unmanned aerial vehicles of the Soviet Union